TSS Cambria was a twin screw passenger steamship operated by the London and North Western Railway from 1897 to 1923.

History
She was built by William Denny and Brothers of Dumbarton for the London and North Western Railway in 1897 in response to the competition launched by the City of Dublin Steam Packet Company who had launched a steamer in 1896 capable of 24 knots and a Holyhead to Dublin crossing time of 2¾ hours.

She was requisitioned by the Admiralty as an Armed boarding steamer in 1914 and became a hospital ship after August 1915.

She was renamed TSS Arvonia in 1919. In August 1922 she was again requisitioned as a troopship, this time by the Irish Free State along with 

In 1925 she was scrapped.

References

1897 ships
1922 in Ireland
Armed boarding steamers of the Royal Navy
Ships built on the River Clyde
Hospital ships in World War I
Hospital ships of the Royal Navy
 
Passenger ships of the United Kingdom
Ships of the London and North Western Railway
Steamships